The Twin is a 1984 French comedy film directed by Yves Robert, starring Pierre Richard, Camilla More and Carey More. Based on Donald Westlake's novel Two Much, the story involves an indebted Frenchman who meets a pair of beautiful and rich American twin sisters. Inventing a twin brother, he manages to marry both and live their opulent lifestyle.

Its American/Spanish remake Two Much, starring Antonio Banderas and Melanie Griffith, was released in 1995.

Plot
Owner of a struggling business in Paris, Matthias Duval stakes all he has in a game of poker and loses. At a party he meets a beautiful young American, Liz, and they soon end up in bed. Next morning she says that she has a twin called Betty, to which he jokes that he has a twin called Mathieu. When he meets Betty, she says she must meet his brother. Creating a different persona as "Mathieu", he starts romancing Betty as well. What he does not know is that each sister must get married by the end of the year or she will lose her share of the fortune left by their parents. The lawyer in charge of the estate, Volpinex, warns Matthias to stay away from them.

Betty marries "Mathieu" secretly, and next morning as Matthias he decides he must break with Liz. She convinces him to get engaged to her by the promise of 4,000 dollars a month plus sexual freedom. Using the latter clause, in persona as Matthias he spends a night with Liz. She flies him to the US to marry him there. Matthias then leaves Liz to go on an imaginary business trip to Japan, while "Mathieu" joins his wife Betty and her lonely sister in an isolated seaside house they own,

When the twins are out one night, the lawyer Volpinex appears. He has solid evidence that there is only one Matthias, who has married bigamously to defraud the parents' estate. In a struggle, Volpinex is accidentally shot and a fire accidentally started. "Mathieu" disappears, learning from the radio that the police believe the charred corpse to be his and that Volpinex, who has disappeared, must be the murderer. Hastily returning from Japan, Matthias resumes relations with his wife Liz and comforts the bereaved Betty. In fact, the girls knew of his duplicity all along and are happy to live as a ménage à trois.

Cast 
Pierre Richard as Matthias Duval/"Matthieu Duval"
Jean-Pierre Kalfon as Ernest Volpinex
Camilla More as Betty Kerner
Carey More	as Liz Kerner
Jacques Frantz as Ralph
Françoise Dorner as Marie
Andréa Ferréol as Evie
Jean-Pierre Castaldi as Charlie
Paul Le Person as the beggar
Isabelle Strawa as Nikki
Yves Robert as a man in the elevator (cameo appearance)

References

External links

Review at Films de France
Trailer at Commeaucimena.com

1980s French-language films
1980s sex comedy films
1984 romantic comedy films
1980s screwball comedy films
French sex comedy films
1984 films
French romantic comedy films
Films based on American novels
Films based on works by Donald E. Westlake
Films scored by Vladimir Cosma
1980s French films